Antônio Rebello Júnior (2 February 1906 – 1996) was a Brazilian rower. He competed in the men's eight event at the 1932 Summer Olympics.

References

1906 births
1996 deaths
Brazilian male rowers
Olympic rowers of Brazil
Rowers at the 1932 Summer Olympics
Rowers from Rio de Janeiro (city)